Martin County Courthouse may refer to:

 Old Martin County Courthouse, Stuart, Florida
 Martin County Courthouse (Indiana), Shoals, Indiana
 Martin County Courthouse (Kentucky), Inez, Kentucky
 Martin County Courthouse (Minnesota), Fairmont, Minnesota
 Martin County Courthouse (North Carolina), Williamston, North Carolina